CasADi is a free and open source symbolic framework for automatic differentiation and optimal control.

See also
Automatic differentiation
JModelica.org

References

Mathematical optimization software
Free software programmed in Python